2015 Emperor's Cup Final was the 95th final of the Emperor's Cup competition. The final was played at Tokyo Stadium in Tokyo on January 1, 2016. Gamba Osaka won the championship.

Match details

See also
2015 Emperor's Cup

References

Emperor's Cup
2015 in Japanese football
Gamba Osaka matches
Urawa Red Diamonds matches